HD 76236, also designated as HR 3543 or rarely 11 G. Chamaeleontis, is a solitary star located in the southern circumpolar constellation Chamaeleon. It is faintly visible to the naked eye as an orange-hued star with an apparent magnitude of 5.77. Based on parallax measurements from the Gaia satellite, the object is estimated to be 612 light years away. At its current distance, HD 76236's brightness is diminished by 0.39 magnitudes due to interstellar dust. It has an absolute magnitude of −0.13.

This is an evolved red giant with a stellar classification K5 III. HD 76236 has an iron abundance nearly twice of the Sun's, making it metal enriched. An infrared excess has been detected around HD 76236, indicating that the star may have a circumstellar disk.

References

Chamaeleon (constellation)
K-type giants
Chamaeleontis, 11
076236
043012
3543
PD-79 352
Circumstellar disks